Cezary Kuleszyński (27 November 1937 – 2 January 2011) was a Polish male hurdler.

1937 births
2011 deaths
Polish athletics coaches
Polish male hurdlers
Place of birth missing